Ye Olde Trip to Jerusalem is a Grade II listed public house in Nottingham which claims to have been established in 1189, although there is no documentation to verify this date.  The building rests against Castle Rock, upon which Nottingham Castle is built, and is attached to several caves, carved out of the soft sandstone. These were reputedly originally used as a brewhouse for the castle, dating from the medieval period.

Name 
The earliest known reference to the name "Ye Olde Trip to Jerusalem" was in 1799. Before being known by its current name, it is believed that the pub was named "The Pilgrim" and references to this name date back to 1751. The current name is believed to come from the belief that pilgrims or crusaders would stop at the inn on their journey to Jerusalem. Some elements of the pub's name are misunderstood in the modern day: "Ye Olde" is properly pronounced "the old" and "trip" refers to a stop on a journey, rather than the journey itself.

Locals often use a shortened version of the name, "the Trip".

Oldest pub in England

Ye Olde Trip to Jerusalem is one of several pubs claiming to be the oldest in England – others that claim to be the oldest include Ye Olde Salutation Inn and The Bell Inn, also in Nottingham, and Ye Olde Fighting Cocks in St Albans, north of London. 

The pub claims that it was established in 1189 AD – the year that Richard the Lionheart became king and Pope Gregory VIII called for a Third Crusade to the Holy Land; however, there is no documentation to verify this date. Evidence suggests that caves in the rock against which the pub is built were used as a brewhouse for Nottingham Castle, and may date from around the time the castle was built in 1067. 

The oldest parts of the current building were likely constructed between 1650 and 1660, though a map by John Speed shows a previous building in existence in 1610. By 1751 the building was being used as an inn with the name The Pilgrim, and was shortly after that date purchased by William Standford.  The first record of the use of the name Ye Olde Trip to Jerusalem dates from 1799.

Brewhouse
Brew House Yard acquired its name after 1680.

References

External links

Pubs in Nottingham
12th-century establishments in England
National Inventory Pubs
Tourist attractions in Nottingham
Grade II listed buildings in Nottinghamshire